The Hitachi Rail Italy Driverless Metro is a class of driverless electric multiple units and corresponding signaling system. Manufactured by Hitachi Rail Italy (formerly AnsaldoBreda) and Hitachi Rail STS (former name Ansaldo STS) in Italy, it is or will be used on the Copenhagen Metro, Princess Nora bint Abdul Rahman University, the Brescia Metro, the Thessaloniki Metro, Line 5 and Line 4 of the Milan Metro, Line C of the Rome Metro, Honolulu on the HART system, and the Yellow Line of the Taipei Metro. The first system to use this class of driverless electric multiple units was the Copenhagen Metro which was opened in 2002.

The rolling stock consists of two to six articulated cars which operate on standard gauge. The systems are fully automated, consisting of automatic train protection (ATP), automatic train operation (ATO) and automatic train supervision.

Rolling stock

The rolling stock uses standardized car bodies, articulated together. The number of cars varies across the different systems where they are used. The trains used on the Princess Nora bint Abdul Rahman University system are 2-car units. The vehicles are designed by Giugiaro Design.

In each car, the two motors are fed by the car's own insulated-gate bipolar transistor. They transform the 750-volt (1,500 V in Rome) direct current collected from the third rail shoe to the three-phase alternating current used in the motors. Trains are fully compatible with platform screen doors, which are found at all stations in Brescia, Rome and Milan, Copenhagen, and Thessaloniki.

Automation
The systems are controlled by a fully automated computer system, located at the control and maintenance center.  The automatic train control (ATC) consists of three subsystems: automatic train protection (ATP), automatic train operation (ATO) and automatic train supervision (ATS). The ATP is responsible for managing the trains' speed, ensuring that doors are closed before departure and that switches are correctly set. The system uses fixed block signaling, except around stations, where moving block signaling is used. The system has been designed and built by Union Switch & Signal.

The ATO is the autopilot that drives the trains in line with a pre-defined schedule, ensures that the train stop at stations and operates the doors. The ATS monitors all components of the network, including the rails and all trains on the system, and displays a live schematic at the control center. The ATC is designed so that only the ATP is safety-critical, and will halt trains if the other systems have faults. Other aspects of the system, such a power supply, ventilation, security alarms, cameras and pumps, are controlled by a system called "control, regulating and surveillance".

The most common repairs are the grinding of the wheels; more complicated repairs are made by replacing entire components that are sent to the manufacturer. By having components in reserve, trains can have shorter maintenance times. The center also has the system's work trains, including a diesel locomotive that can fetch broken trains. At any time, there are four people working at the control center. Two monitor the ATC system, one monitors passenger information, while the last is responsible for secondary systems, such as power supply. In case of technical problems, there is always a team of technicians who can be sent to perform repairs. Although the trains are not equipped with drivers, there are stewards that help passengers, perform ticket controls and assist in emergency situations.

Operators

Brescia

The Brescia Metro is a system which opened in March 2013 in Brescia, Italy. The  system was built in three stages and has 17 stations. The system features a 90-second headway. ASM Brescia ordered 18 trains which are now being used on the Metro.

Copenhagen

The Copenhagen Metro, Denmark, consists of four lines, M1, M2, M3 and M4 that run  serving 37 stations. The system opened in 2002 and was expanded in 2019 with further expansion being planned and evaluated. The first lines connects the city center to the areas of Frederiksberg and Amager, and Copenhagen Airport. The next extension, the City Circle Line opened on 29 September 2019. Metroselskabet took delivery of 34 three-car units between 2002 and 2007, and operates with a headway of between two and twenty minutes, including an all-night service. In April 2008, the Copenhagen Metro won the award at MetroRail 2008 for the world's best metro.

Honolulu

The Honolulu Rail Transit project will be a  elevated rail route which will connect the city of Honolulu on the island of Oahu in Hawaii with outlying suburbs. The project is planned to open in phases starting in 2021, with the entire 21 station route to be completed in between 2025 and 2028. AnsaldoBreda Driverless Metro rolling stock will be used for the system. Honolulu politicians and construction crews broke ground on the project on February 22, 2011, in Kapolei, Hawaii. As of October 2012, construction of the columns and foundations have been completed for the first  mile of the route. Future extensions to the route have been planned, which include spurs to the route and 15 additional stations.  Construction of the project is currently on hold as litigation resulting from Kaleikini v. Yoshioka court case bars continuation of the project until the City and County submits a complete archeological survey to the State Historic Preservation Division for the entire line.

Lima

The Line 2 of Lima Metro and a branch of Line 4, which will connect the city of east to west in the first case and the portion of line 4 linking the Jorge Chavez International Airport with the line 2, is currently under construction. The line will be built in two phases, the first of which is scheduled to open in 2017 and the second in 2020. The total of the 2 lines will cost US$5,346,000.

Milan

The Milan Metro's Line 5 first section between Bignami and the interconnection with M3 at Zara opened on 10 February 2013. The second stage opened on 1 March 2014, and runs from Zara to Porta Garibaldi station. The third opened in 2015, and runs from Garibaldi to San Siro stadium. The fourth section will run from Bignami to Monza, and it is planned to open by 2027.

Milan Metro's fourth line is currently under construction and will run from Linate Airport to San Cristoforo. The first section, running from Linate to Dateo, opened on 26 November 2022, while the completion of the line is expected to be in 2024.

Riyadh

An 11·5 km metro serving the Princess Nora Bint Abdulrahman University on the outskirts of Riyadh opened in 2012.

Rome

Metropolitana di Roma has ordered thirty six-car units, which are  wider than the other systems' vehicles, and capable of carrying 1,200 passengers per train.

Taipei

The Yellow Line or Circular Line of the Taipei Metro, Taiwan, will serve as a cross-link between existing lines. The  system will feature 42 or 41 stations. The  phase 1 has 14 stations and was completed in January 2020. The Taipei Rapid Transit Corporation purchased 17 trains for this phase.

Thessaloniki

Construction on Greece's second metro system began in 2006 and is scheduled to open in phases from 2023, at a cost of €1.57 billion ($ billion). The  system will feature 18 stations in 2021. 33 driverless AnsaldoBreda units will be put to operation on the two lines. Those will be articulated in 4 sections with a capacity of 466 passengers (96 seated and 370 standing).

References

AnsaldoBreda multiple units
Copenhagen Metro
Rome Metro
Milan Metro
Taipei Metro
Electric multiple units of the United States
Electric multiple units of Greece
Electric multiple units of Taiwan
Electric railcars and multiple units of Italy
Multiple units of Denmark
750 V DC multiple units
1500 V DC multiple units
Automated guideway transit